Sue Cahill (born 1959) is an American politician and educator. A Democrat, she has been a member of the Iowa House of Representatives for the 52nd district since 2021.

Early life and education 
Cahill was born in 1959 in Kansas City, Missouri. She graduated from Archbishop O'Hara High School and received a bachelor's of arts degree in communications from Benedictine College and a bachelor's of arts degree in education from Buena Vista University. She earned a masters of education from Graceland University. She worked as a teacher in the Marshalltown Community School District and served as a member of the city council of Marshalltown, Iowa. During the 2020 Iowa Democratic presidential caucuses, Cahill supported Pete Buttigieg.

Career 
Cahill was first elected to the Iowa House of Representatives for the 71st district in 2020, assuming office on January 11, 2021. She ran unopposed in the Democratic primary and defeated Republican nominee Tony Reed in the November general election, receiving 6,800 votes to his 5,315. She is a member of the administration and rules committee, the education committee, the labor committee and ranking member of the veterans affairs committee.

In the 2022 general election, Cahill is running unopposed in the 52nd district, a new district which was created during the 2020 redistricting cycle.

Personal life 
Cahill has six sons. Her husband, John, died of colon cancer in 2006.

References 

Living people
Politicians from Kansas City, Missouri
Schoolteachers from Iowa
Iowa city council members
Politicians from Marshalltown, Iowa
Graceland University alumni
Democratic Party members of the Iowa House of Representatives
21st-century American women politicians
21st-century American politicians
Women city councillors in Iowa
21st-century American women educators
21st-century American educators
1959 births